MAFF may refer to:

 MAFF (gene), a transcription factor
 Malmö Arab Film Festival, held in Malmö (Sweden), the largest Arabic film festival in Europe
 Ministry of Agriculture, Fisheries and Food (United Kingdom), a former department of UK government
 Ministry of Agriculture, Forestry and Fisheries, Cambodia
 Ministry of Agriculture, Forestry and Fisheries (Japan)
 Mozilla Archive Format, a web page archiving format provided by Firefox through an extension